Panther's Moon is a 1948 spy thriller novel by the British writer Victor Canning. It was his second post-war novel, following The Chasm, as he had largely been taken a break from writing during his wartime service.

Synopsis
Roger Quain is tasked by his circus owner uncle to bring a couple of black panthers from Milan to Paris. The next before he leaves Italy he is approached by an attractive young woman who identifies herself as a member of British intelligence. Urgently needing to smuggle microfilm out of Italy she believes that the panthers offer the perfect opportunity to get them across the border. Things go wrong, however, when their train is derailed in the Swiss Alps and both the panthers and the microfilm disappear.

Film adaptation
In 1950 it was adapted into the American film Spy Hunt directed by George Sherman and starring Howard Duff, Märta Torén and Philip Friend.

References

Bibliography
 Burton, Alan. Historical Dictionary of British Spy Fiction. Rowman & Littlefield, 2016.
 Goble, Alan. The Complete Index to Literary Sources in Film. Walter de Gruyter, 1999.
 Reilly, John M. Twentieth Century Crime & Mystery Writers. Springer, 2015.

1948 British novels
British spy novels
British thriller novels
Novels set in Italy
Novels set in Switzerland
British novels adapted into films
Novels by Victor Canning
Hodder & Stoughton books